John Harlow (19 August 1896 – 1977) was an English film director, active from the 1930s to the 1950s.  Harlow worked for smaller studios, mainly in crime/thriller genre potboilers, with his better known films including Candles at Nine (1944), the Sexton Blake thrillers Meet Sexton Blake and The Echo Murders (both 1945), Appointment with Crime (1946) and the 1947 reincarnation drama While I Live.  He also directed two late entries in the popular, if critically unappreciated, Old Mother Riley series.

Filmography (director)
1933: My Lucky Star
1934: Master and Man
1941: Spellbound
1942: This Was Paris
1943: The Dark Tower
1944: Candles at Nine
1944: Headline
1945: The Agitator
1945: Meet Sexton Blake
1945: The Echo Murders
1946: Appointment with Crime
1947: Green Fingers
1947: While I Live
1949: Old Mother Riley's New Venture
1950: Old Mother Riley Headmistress
1953: Those People Next Door
1953: The Blue Parrot
1954: Dangerous Cargo
1954: Delayed Action

External links

1896 births
1977 deaths
English film directors
People from Ross-on-Wye